Mohamed Ali Sassi (born March 20, 1980) is a Tunisian Olympic boxer . He represented his native North African country at the 2004 Summer Olympics in Athens, Greece. There he was stopped in the first round of the Men's Light-Welterweight (– 64 kg) competition by France's Willy Blain.

Ali Sassi qualified for the Athens Games by winning the gold medal at the 1st AIBA African 2004 Olympic Qualifying Tournament in Casablanca, Morocco. In the final of the event he defeated home fighter Hicham Nafil. He won a bronze medal at the 2001 Mediterranean Games in Tunis, Tunisia.

References
Profile

1980 births
Living people
Light-welterweight boxers
Boxers at the 2004 Summer Olympics
Olympic boxers of Tunisia
Tunisian male boxers

Mediterranean Games bronze medalists for Tunisia
Competitors at the 2001 Mediterranean Games
Mediterranean Games medalists in boxing
21st-century Tunisian people
20th-century Tunisian people